Miss Ecuador 2021 was the 71st edition of the Miss Ecuador pageant. The contest was held on September 11, 2021 in Quevedo, Los Ríos. Leyla Espinoza from Los Ríos crowned her successor at the end of the event. The winner will represent Ecuador at Miss Universe 2021, and the first Runner-up will compete at Miss International 2022.

Results

Final Results

§ - Voted in the Top 7 by the public

Special Awards

Best National Costume

Contestants
There are 20 official delegates to compete at Miss Ecuador 2021:

Notes

Returns
Last competed in 2018

Last competed in 2019

Withdrawals

Crossover
Betsabeth Heredia competed at Reina de Cuenca 2017, but she was unplaced. Also, she competed at Miss World Ecuador 2018 where she failed to make the first cut.
Katherine Idrovo competed at Reina de Cuenca 2019, but she was unplaced.
Verónica Mora competed at Reina de Milagro 2018 where she finished as 2nd Runner-up/Piña Dulce (3rd place).
Leidy Granda was Reina de Celica 2018 and competed at Reina de la Provincia de Loja 2018 where she ended up as 2nd Runner-up.
Karla Romero was Reina de Quevedo 2014 and Virreina de Los Ríos 2014 (1st Runner-up). Also, she competed at Reina Mundial del Banano Los Ríos, but she did not place.
Susana Sacoto competed at Reina de Portoviejo 2018, but she was unplaced.
Marilyn Torres was Reina de El Chaco 2019.
Valeria Gútierrez is from Guayaquil, but she represented the Ecuadorian community in the United States.

References

External links
Official Miss Ecuador website

2021 beauty pageants
Beauty pageants in Ecuador
Miss Ecuador